Asa (Asa) is a village in southeastern Kazakhstan. It is the seat of Jambyl District of Jambyl Region. Population:

References 

Populated places in Jambyl Region